Sydney Metro City & Southwest is a  rapid transit project currently under-construction in Sydney, New South Wales, Australia. Together with planned improvements to the Main Western line, the project is expected to increase capacity on the Sydney rail network by up to 60%, and allow for the movement of over 100,000 extra commuters across the network every hour.

The project began construction in 2017 and is planned to open by 2024. Tunnelling was completed in March 2020. It is estimated that it will eventually cost up to $16.8 billion due to budget blowouts and station redesigns.

Project History
In 2013, a proposal was raised to extend the then-proposed North West Rail Link, by building a metro-style tunnel from just south of Chatswood Station via St Leonards and North Sydney and under the Sydney Harbour towards Central and Redfern, before joining the newly converted metro lines towards Hurstville, Bankstown, Lidcombe and Liverpool. This largely renews a previous proposal known as the CBD Rail Link (see below), except with metro-style trains instead. The Hurstville extension was subsequently dropped.

The proposal was officially announced by the New South Wales government on 10 June 2014. The proposal was contingent on funding from privatising at least 49% of the state's power infrastructure, which was secured in June 2015.

Chatswood to Sydenham section 

Planning approval for the Chatswood to Sydenham section of the project was received in January 2017. In June 2017, a John Holland, CPB Contractors and Ghella joint venture was awarded the contract to build the twin tunnels from Chatswood to Sydenham.

A contract for a major upgrade of Central station was awarded to Laing O'Rourke in March 2018. The project includes construction of two new underground platforms to serve the metro and a new underground concourse called Central Walk. The new platforms will be built beneath platforms 13-14.

Tunnelling commenced in October 2018.

In November 2018, a $1.376 billion contract was awarded to an unincorporated joint venture between CPB Contractors and UGL to be known as Systems Connect, which will include the laying of track from Chatswood to Sydenham as well as converting power on the Bankstown line to Metro standards and also the building of further Metro train facilities at Rouse Hill and Marrickville.

Sydenham to Bankstown section 

From Sydenham, the Sydney Metro takes over the existing Bankstown railway line between Sydenham to Bankstown, which will be converted from heavy rail to rapid transit standard. Bankstown will become an interchange station between the Metro and the remaining short stub of the Bankstown railway line. The conversion and incorporation of this section of track into Sydney Metro has not been without controversy, with a letter written by four former rail executives John Brew, Ron Christie, Bob O’Loughlin and Dick Day casting doubts on the government's claims of improved reliability as well as warning that commuters west of Bankstown face additional interchange for travel towards the City Circle.

Planning approval of the upgrade of Bankstown Line between Sydenham and Bankstown was received in December 2018. The Inquiry to be conducted by Portfolio Committee 6 - Transport and Customer Service and chaired by Abigail Boyd released its report on 9 April 2020, recommending that the conversion not take place with Sydney Metro instead to terminate at Sydenham. The NSW Government rejected most recommendations from this report.

In December 2020, it was confirmed that when the Bankstown Line closes for conversion to metro in 2024, the Liverpool to City service via Regents Park and Lidcombe will be reinstated and a shuttle branch service will run between Lidcombe and Bankstown. Regents Park will be the main interchange point between both services as the direct train between Bankstown and Liverpool will be withdrawn.

Route 

The project is a major extension of the Metro North West Line, connecting Chatswood–the line's current terminus–to Sydenham, with new stations at Crows Nest, Victoria Cross, Barangaroo, Martin Place, Pitt Street, Central and Waterloo. At Sydenham, the line would join the existing Bankstown railway line, which will be converted to rapid transit standards between Sydenham and Bankstown as part of the Sydney Metro City & Southwest project.

The original list of stations consisted of Crows Nest, Victoria Cross, Martin Place, Central, Sydenham and the stations of the Bankstown line. Potential additional stations were also proposed for the industrial area of Artarmon (underground), St Leonards, Barangaroo and either the University of Sydney or Waterloo. Barangaroo station was confirmed in June 2015 and Waterloo was confirmed in December. The other three stations will not be included in the project.The remaining stations served by the T3 Bankstown Line (Erskineville, St Peters and 9 stations west of Bankstown towards Lidcombe / Cabramatta) will continue to be served by Sydney Trains.

Potential extension
A scoping study into rail investment to service Western Sydney and the proposed Western Sydney Airport was announced by the New South Wales and Australian governments in November 2015. The study's final report was released in March 2018 and included a proposal to extend the Sydney Metro City & Southwest from Bankstown to Liverpool. The extension is unlikely to be built for at least 20 years.

Previous proposals

CBD Rail Link
The CBD Rail Link was a component of the now-cancelled Metropolitan Rail Expansion Program (MREP) in Sydney. First announced in 2005, the  line was to have started at Redfern Station, travelled under the city centre, crossed under Sydney Harbour, passed through the lower North Shore and ended at the existing Chatswood railway station. It was to have provided the centre section of a planned North West-CBD-South West rail arc connecting major areas of employment with the CBD and airport. Alternative names for the planned route have included the Redfern to Chatswood Rail Link (RCRL), Redfern to Chatswood Harbour Rail Link and MetroPitt.

The proposal was announced by Labor Premier Bob Carr on 15 June 2005 (shortly before his resignation), and formed part of the $8 billion Metropolitan Rail Expansion Project (MREP).  The MREP consisted of the New South Wales government's $8 billion North West - CBD - South West line, including the North West Rail Link (to extend from Cheltenham to Rouse Hill), and the spur to Leppington in Sydney's South West.  The six kilometre CBD Rail Link was slated to cost $5 billion, and was to include duplicated tracks on the North Shore line between St Leonards and Chatswood. It was to provide a second railway line transversing Sydney Harbour to ease congestion at Town Hall and Wynyard stations, both considerably crowded and unable to be easily expanded, and to reduce travel times between the city and the lower North Shore.

The government's previous plan of constructing an additional CBD underground line was known as MetroWest. It was to have run from Haymarket in the city's Chinatown precinct near Darling Harbour, along the western edge of the city under Sussex or Kent Street and either ended at Wynyard station or continued over the harbour 'strapped' to the Sydney Harbour Bridge. This option would not have served the part of the city experiencing the fastest growth of employment, and would have necessitated the destruction of eight office buildings. A previous MetroPitt proposal, travelling further east (and under its namesake Pitt Street) and through the financial district, could also be built deeper underground, limiting the impact on existing infrastructure.

In 2006, both of these corridors were protected with planning buffers to allow the option of future construction. Developers who want to excavate deeper than two metres within a 25-metre buffer zone of the corridors need to seek RailCorp's approval.

In the plan the stations along the CBD Rail Link would have included:
 Redfern - connecting to the metro lines to Hurstville, Bankstown and Liverpool
 Central - interchanging with all lines through the CBD then 
 Pitt Street
 Martin Place - interchanging with the Eastern Suburbs & Illawarra Line
 Circular Quay - interchanging with the Bankstown, Inner West, South & Airport/East Hills Lines
 Victoria Cross
 Crows Nest
 St Leonards - interchanging with the North Shore and Northern Lines
 Chatswood - interchanging with the North Shore and Northern Lines

A map of the protected corridors suggested there may have been the potential for another station at Macquarie Place, between The Rocks and Castlereagh Street.

In March 2008 the State Government announced that the line would be cancelled, its role to be partly superseded by future metro rail lines.

Later Labor proposals

One of the metro lines announced in 2009 by the Rees state government was CBD Metro, which ran along a similar CBD alignment to the current Sydney Metro proposal between Central and Barangaroo. However, the alignment continued west from Baranagaroo, crossing Darling Harbour and heading towards Rozelle and beyond. Therefore, there were no metro lines proposed linking the CBD to Chatswood.

In 2010, the new Keneally government cancelled the entire metro project, and the CBD Relief Line & Western Express concept was announced as replacement. The relief line was largely a return to the CBD Rail Link proposal, but used the MetroWest alignment instead. The line would have offered an alternative heavy rail link in the CBD between Redfern and Wynyard, but also did not cross the harbour into the North Shore. The relief line was cancelled by the incoming Liberal-Nationals government when they won the 2011 state election, who then announced the current project in 2014.

See also
 Transport in Sydney in the 2010s
 Metro Tunnel - similar project in Melbourne
 Cross River Rail - similar project in Brisbane
 City Rail Link - similar project in Auckland, New Zealand

References

Proposed railway lines in Australia
Sydney Metro
Tunnels in Sydney
Tunnel construction
2024 in rail transport